Maurice Dambrun (born 2 December 1887, date of death unknown) was a French architect. His work was part of the architecture event in the art competition at the 1924 Summer Olympics.

References

1887 births
Year of death missing
20th-century French architects
Olympic competitors in art competitions
Architects from Paris